The Ministry of Livestock and Fisheries may refer to:

 Ministry of Livestock and Fisheries (Tanzania), the livestock and fisheries ministry of Tanzania
 Ministry of Livestock, Fisheries and Rural Development, the ministry in Myanmar